Amelanchier sinica, commonly known as the Chinese serviceberry, is a serviceberry native to China. Its fruit,  a pome, is dark-blue when it ripens.

References

External links
Amelanchier sinica Information

sinica
Flora of China